The Girl: A Life in the Shadow of Roman Polanski is a book written by Samantha Geimer about her life.  She wrote it with the help of her lawyer Lawrence Silver and the writer Judith Newman. An excerpt was published by Today.com in 2013.

Reception
The Guardian said that it was "fighting against reductive simplicity".
Time Magazine called it "a thoughtful memoir.”
The New York Times said "[Geimer] is able to channel the bewilderment she felt while in Mr. Polanski’s company, and the terror that came later."

See also
 Roman Polanski: Wanted and Desired 2008 documentary film
 Roman Polanski sexual abuse case

References

2013 non-fiction books
American memoirs
Roman Polanski
Books about rape
Simon & Schuster books